Eliseo Insfrán Orué (born 27 October 1935 in Asunción, Paraguay) is a Paraguayan footballer who played for clubs in Paraguay, Colombia and Chile and for the Paraguay national football team in the FIFA World Cup in Sweden in 1958.

Teams
 Guaraní 1954–1966
 Deportes Quindío 1966
 Libertad 1967
 O'Higgins 1968
 Sportivo Luqueño 1969–1970

References

External links
 Profile at FIFA Profile at

1935 births
Living people
Sportspeople from Asunción
Paraguayan footballers
Paraguayan expatriate footballers
Paraguay international footballers
Paraguayan Primera División players
Club Guaraní players
Club Libertad footballers
Sportivo Luqueño players
Deportes Quindío footballers
O'Higgins F.C. footballers
Chilean Primera División players
1958 FIFA World Cup players
Expatriate footballers in Chile
Paraguayan expatriate sportspeople in Chile
Expatriate footballers in Colombia
Paraguayan expatriate sportspeople in Colombia
Association football forwards